Hazel Flagg is a 1953 musical, book by Ben Hecht, based on a story by James H. Street. The lyrics are by Bob Hilliard, and music by Jule Styne. The musical is based on the 1937 screwball comedy film Nothing Sacred, the primary screenwriter of which was Ben Hecht.

Production
The musical opened on Broadway at the Mark Hellinger Theatre on February 11 and closed on September 19, 1953, after 190 performances. Direction was by David Alexander, with musical staging by Robert Alton and costumes by Miles White.
 
The cast included Helen Gallagher (Hazel), John Howard (Wallace Cook), Thomas Mitchell (Dr. Downer), Benay Venuta (Laura Carew), Jack Whiting (mayor of New York), Ross Martin (Dr. Egelhofer), Jonathan Harris (Oleander), Sheree North in her Broadway debut (Whitey), and John Brascia (Willie).

Paramount Pictures, which owned the rights to the source material for Nothing Sacred, also acquired the rights to produce a film version of Hazel Flagg. The Dean Martin and Jerry Lewis film Living It Up (1954) is based on the musical, with Hazel Flagg rewritten as a man, Homer Flagg (played by Lewis) and Wallace Cook rewritten as a woman,  Wally Cook (played by Janet Leigh). The one hit song from Hazel Flagg, "Every Street's a Boulevard in Old New York", was performed in this movie by Martin and Lewis.

Plot synopsis
Wallace Cook, a writer for Everywhere magazine, suggests that his editor should run an article about small-town girl Hazel Flagg, purportedly dying from exposure to radium. Cook invites her to New York City for an interview. After accepting, she discovers that she was misdiagnosed, but eager to visit the big city, decides not to reveal the truth, and becomes a media darling embraced by a public deeply moved by her sad story.

Song list
Sources: Dietz, Dan (2014) The Complete Book of 1950s Broadway Musicals; Guide to Musical Theatre website
 

Act I
 A Little More Hear -- Laura Carew, Wallace Cook and Magazine Staff
 The World Is Beautiful Today -- Hazel Flagg
 I'm Glad I'm Leaving --Hazel Flagg
 The Rutland Bounce -- Vermont Villager, Man on the Street, Dancer and Villagers
 Hello Hazel -- Laura Carew and New Yorkers
 Paris Gown (ballet) -- Hazel Flagg, Maximilian Lavian, Dancers, Models and Attendants
 The World Is Beautiful Today -- Wallace Cook and Editors
 Every Street's a Boulevard in Old New York -- Mayor of New York
 How Do You Speak to an Angel -- Wallace Cook
 Autograph Chant --Autograph Hunters
 I Feel Like I'm Gonna Live Forever -- Hazel Flagg
 You're Gonna Dance With Me, Willie -- Hazel Flagg, Willie and Company

Act II
 Who Is the Bravest? -- University Glee Club
 Dream Parade (ballet)-- Hazel Flagg and Company
 Salome -- Dancing Girls, Salome, Cowboy Singer and Cowboy Dancers
 Everybody Loves To Take a Bow -- Laura Carew, Mayor of New York and Men
 Laura De Maupassant --Hazel Flagg
 Autograph Chant (Reprise) -- Autograph Hunters
 I Feel Like I'm Gonna Live Forever (Reprise) -- Company
 How Do you Speak to an Angel (Reprise) -- Company

Awards
 1953 Tony Award for Best Actor in a Musical (Thomas Mitchell)
 1953 Tony Award for Best Costume Design (Play or Musical) (Miles White)
 1953 Theatre World Award (Sheree North)

Further reading

References

External links
 
ON THE RECORD, CD review, playbill.com, June 27, 2004
Time Magazine review (February 23, 1953)

1953 musicals
Broadway musicals
Musicals based on films
Musicals by Jule Styne
Plays set in New York City
Tony Award-winning musicals